The scale of a map is the ratio of a distance on the map to the corresponding distance on the ground. This simple concept is complicated by the curvature of the Earth's surface, which forces scale to vary across a map. Because of this variation, the concept of scale becomes meaningful in two distinct ways.

The first way is the ratio of the size of the generating globe to the size of the Earth. The generating globe is a conceptual model to which the Earth is shrunk and from which the map is projected. The ratio of the Earth's size to the generating globe's size is called the nominal scale (= principal scale = representative fraction). Many maps state the nominal scale and may even display a bar scale (sometimes merely called a 'scale') to represent it.

The second distinct concept of scale applies to the variation in scale across a map. It is the ratio of the mapped point's scale to the nominal scale. In this case 'scale' means the scale factor (= point scale = particular scale).

If the region of the map is small enough to ignore Earth's curvature, such as in a town plan, then a single value can be used as the scale without causing measurement errors. In maps covering larger areas, or the whole Earth, the map's scale may be less useful or even useless in measuring distances. The map projection becomes critical in understanding how scale varies throughout the map. When scale varies noticeably, it can be accounted for as the scale factor. Tissot's indicatrix is often used to illustrate the variation of point scale across a map.

History
The foundations for quantitative map scaling goes back to ancient China with textual evidence that the idea of map scaling was understood by the second century BC. Ancient Chinese surveyors and cartographers had ample technical resources used to produce maps such as counting rods, carpenter's square's, plumb lines, compasses for drawing circles, and sighting tubes for measuring inclination. Reference frames postulating a nascent coordinate system for identifying locations were hinted by ancient Chinese astronomers that divided the sky into various sectors or lunar lodges.

The Chinese cartographer and geographer Pei Xiu of the Three Kingdoms period created a set of large-area maps that were drawn to scale. He produced a set of principles that stressed the importance of consistent scaling, directional measurements, and adjustments in land measurements in the terrain that was being mapped.

Terminology

Representation of scale
Map scales may be expressed in words (a lexical scale), as a ratio, or as a fraction. Examples are:
'one centimetre to one hundred metres'    or    1:10,000   or    1/10,000
'one inch to one mile'    or    1:63,360    or    1/63,360
'one centimetre to one thousand kilometres'   or   1:100,000,000    or    1/100,000,000.  (The ratio would usually be abbreviated to 1:100M)

Bar scale vs. lexical scale
In addition to the above many maps carry one or more (graphical) bar scales. For example, some modern British maps have three bar scales, one each for kilometres, miles and nautical miles.

A lexical scale in a language known to the user may be easier to visualise than a ratio: if the scale is an inch to two miles and the map user can see two villages that are about two inches apart on the map, then it is easy to work out that the villages are about four miles apart on the ground.

A lexical scale may cause problems if it expressed in a language that the user does not understand or in obsolete or ill-defined units.  For example, a scale of one inch to a furlong (1:7920) will be understood by many older people in countries where Imperial units used to be taught in schools. But a scale of one pouce to one league may be about 1:144,000, depending on the cartographer's choice of the many possible definitions for a league, and only a minority of modern users will be familiar with the units used.

Large scale, medium scale, small scale
Contrast to spatial scale.
A map is classified as small scale or large scale or sometimes medium scale. Small scale refers to world maps or maps of large regions such as continents or large nations. In other words, they show large areas of land on a small space. They are called small scale because the representative fraction is relatively small.

Large-scale maps show smaller areas in more detail, such as county maps or town plans might. Such maps are called large scale because the representative fraction is relatively large. For instance a town plan, which is a large-scale map, might be on a scale of 1:10,000, whereas the world map, which is a small scale map, might be on a scale of 1:100,000,000.

The following table describes typical ranges for these scales but should not be considered authoritative because there is no standard:

The terms are sometimes used in the absolute sense of the table, but other times in a relative sense. For example, a map reader whose work refers solely to large-scale maps (as tabulated above) might refer to a map at 1:500,000 as small-scale.

In the English language, the word large-scale is often used to mean "extensive". However, as explained above, cartographers use the term "large scale" to refer to less extensive maps – those that show a smaller area. Maps that show an extensive area are "small scale" maps. This can be a cause of confusion.

Scale variation
Mapping large areas causes noticeable distortions because it significantly flattens the curved surface of the earth. How distortion gets distributed depends on the map projection. Scale varies across the map, and the stated map scale is only an approximation. This is discussed in detail below.

Large-scale maps with curvature neglected
The region over which the earth can be regarded as flat depends on the accuracy of the survey measurements. If surveyed to the nearest , then curvature is undetectable over a meridian distance of about 10 km and over an east-west line of about 8 km. Thus a plan of New York City accurate to one metre or a building site plan accurate to one millimetre would both satisfy the above conditions for the neglect of curvature. They can be treated by plane surveying and mapped by scale drawings in which any two points at the same distance on the drawing are at the same distance on the ground. True ground distances are calculated by measuring the distance on the map and then multiplying by the inverse of the scale fraction or, equivalently, simply using dividers to transfer the separation between the points on the map to a bar scale on the map.

Point scale (or particular scale)

As proved by Gauss’s Theorema Egregium, a sphere (or ellipsoid) cannot be projected onto a plane without distortion. This is commonly illustrated by the impossibility of smoothing an orange peel onto a flat surface without tearing and deforming it. The only true representation of a sphere at constant scale is another sphere such as a globe.

Given the limited practical size of globes, we must use maps for detailed mapping. Maps require projections. A projection implies distortion: A constant separation on the map does not correspond to a constant separation on the ground. While a map may display a graphical bar scale, the scale must be used with the understanding that it will be accurate on only some lines of the map. (This is discussed further in the examples in the following sections.)

Let P be a point at latitude  and longitude  on the sphere (or ellipsoid). Let Q be a neighbouring point and let  be the angle between the element PQ and the meridian at P: this angle is the azimuth angle of the element PQ. Let P' and Q' be corresponding points on the projection. The angle between the direction P'Q' and the projection of the meridian is the bearing . In general . Comment: this precise distinction between azimuth (on the Earth's surface) and bearing (on the map) is not universally observed, many writers using the terms almost interchangeably.

Definition:  the point scale at P is the ratio of the two distances P'Q' and PQ in the limit that Q approaches P. We write this as 

where the notation indicates that the point scale is a function of the position of P and also the direction of the element PQ.

Definition: if the point scale depends only on position, not on direction, we say that it is isotropic and conventionally denote its value in any direction by the parallel scale factor .

Definition: A map projection is said to be conformal if the angle between a pair of lines intersecting at a point P is the same as the angle between the projected lines at the projected point P', for all pairs of lines intersecting at point P. A conformal map has an isotropic scale factor. Conversely isotropic scale factors across the map imply a conformal projection.

Isotropy of scale implies that small elements are stretched equally in all directions, that is the shape of a small element is preserved. This is the property of orthomorphism (from Greek 'right shape'). The qualification 'small' means that at some given accuracy of measurement no change can be detected in the scale factor over the element. Since conformal projections have an isotropic scale factor they have also been called orthomorphic projections. For example, the Mercator projection is conformal since it is constructed to preserve angles and its scale factor is isotropic, a function of latitude only: Mercator does preserve shape in small regions.

Definition: on a conformal projection with an isotropic scale, points which have the same scale value may be joined to form the isoscale lines. These are not plotted on maps for end users but they feature in many of the standard texts. (See Snyder pages 203—206.)

The representative fraction (RF) or principal scale
There are two conventions used in setting down the equations of any given projection. For example, the equirectangular cylindrical projection may be written as
 cartographers:               
 mathematicians:              
Here we shall adopt the first of these conventions (following the usage in the surveys by Snyder). Clearly the above projection equations define positions on a huge cylinder wrapped around the Earth and then unrolled. We say that these coordinates define the projection map which must be distinguished logically from the actual printed (or viewed) maps. If the definition of point scale in the previous section is in terms of the projection map then we can expect the scale factors to be close to unity. For normal tangent cylindrical projections the scale along the equator is k=1 and in general the scale changes as we move off the equator. Analysis of scale on the projection map is an investigation of the change of k away from its true value of unity.

Actual printed maps are produced from the projection map by a constant scaling denoted by a ratio such as 1:100M (for whole world maps) or 1:10000 (for such as town plans). To avoid confusion in the use of the word 'scale' this constant
scale fraction is called the representative fraction (RF) of the printed map and it is to be identified with the ratio printed on the map. The actual printed map coordinates for the equirectangular cylindrical projection are
 printed map:               
This convention allows a clear distinction of the intrinsic projection scaling and the reduction scaling.

From this point we ignore the RF and work with the projection map.

Visualisation of point scale: the Tissot indicatrix

 

Consider a small circle on the surface of the Earth centred at a point P at latitude  and longitude . Since the point scale varies with position and direction the projection of the circle on the projection will be distorted. Tissot proved that, as long as the distortion is not too great, the circle will become an ellipse on the projection. In general the dimension, shape and orientation of the ellipse will change over the projection. Superimposing these distortion ellipses on the map projection conveys the way in which the point scale is changing over the map. The distortion ellipse is known as Tissot's indicatrix. The example shown here is the Winkel tripel projection, the standard projection for world maps made by the National Geographic Society. The minimum distortion is on the central meridian at latitudes of 30 degrees (North and South). (Other examples).

Point scale for normal cylindrical projections of the sphere

The key to a quantitative understanding of scale is to consider an infinitesimal element on the sphere. The figure shows a point P at latitude  and longitude  on the sphere. The point Q is at latitude  and longitude . The lines PM and KQ are arcs of parallel circles of length  with in radian measure. In deriving a point property of the projection at P it suffices to take an infinitesimal element PMQK of the surface: in the limit of Q approaching P such an element tends to an infinitesimally small planar rectangle.

Normal cylindrical projections of the sphere have   and  equal to a function of latitude only. Therefore, the infinitesimal element PMQK on the sphere projects to an infinitesimal element P'M'Q'K' which is an exact rectangle with a base  and height . By comparing the elements on sphere and projection we can immediately deduce expressions for the scale factors on parallels and meridians. (The treatment of scale in a general direction may be found below.)
 parallel scale factor   
meridian scale factor   
Note that the parallel scale factor  
is independent of the definition of  so it is the same for all normal cylindrical projections. It is useful to note that
at latitude 30 degrees the parallel scale is 
at latitude 45 degrees the parallel scale is 
at latitude 60 degrees the parallel scale is 
at latitude 80 degrees the parallel scale is 
at latitude 85 degrees the parallel scale is 

The following examples illustrate three normal cylindrical projections and in each case the variation of scale with position and direction is illustrated by the use of Tissot's indicatrix.

Three examples of normal cylindrical projection

The equirectangular projection
 
The equirectangular projection, also known as the Plate Carrée (French for "flat square") or (somewhat misleadingly) the equidistant projection, is defined by 
   
The longitude  is in the range  and the latitude  is in the range .

Since  the previous section gives
 parallel scale,  
 meridian scale  
For the calculation of the point scale in an arbitrary direction see addendum.

The figure illustrates the Tissot indicatrix for this projection. On the equator h=k=1 and the circular elements are undistorted on projection. At higher latitudes the circles are distorted into an ellipse given by stretching in the parallel direction only: there is no distortion in the meridian direction. Clearly the area of the ellipse increases by the same factor.

It is instructive to consider the use of bar scales that might appear on a printed version of this projection. The scale is true (k=1) on the equator so that multiplying its length on a printed map by the inverse of the RF (or principal scale) gives the actual circumference of the Earth. The bar scale on the map is also drawn at the true scale so that transferring a separation between two points on the equator to the bar scale will give the correct distance between those points. The same is true on the meridians. On a parallel other than the equator the scale is  so when we transfer a separation from a parallel to the bar scale we must divide the bar scale distance by this factor to obtain the distance between the points when measured along the parallel (which is not the true distance along a great circle). On a line at a bearing of say 45 degrees the scale is continuously varying with latitude and transferring a separation along the line to the bar scale does not give a distance related to the true distance in any simple way. (But see addendum). Even if a distance along this line of constant planar angle could be worked out, its relevance is questionable since such a line on the projection corresponds to a complicated curve on the sphere. For these reasons bar scales on small-scale maps must be used with extreme caution.

Mercator projection

The Mercator projection maps the sphere to a rectangle (of infinite extent in the  -direction) by the equations 

Since  the scale factors are:
parallel scale     
meridian scale   

In the Tissot diagram each infinitesimal circular element preserves its shape but is enlarged more and more as the latitude increases.

Lambert's equal area projection

Lambert's equal area projection maps the sphere to a finite rectangle by the equations 

Since  the scale factors are
 parallel scale      
meridian scale    
The calculation of the point scale in an arbitrary direction is given below.

The vertical and horizontal scales now compensate each other (hk=1) and in the Tissot diagram each infinitesimal circular element is distorted into an ellipse of the same area as the undistorted circles on the equator.

Graphs of scale factors

 The graph shows the variation of the scale factors for the above three examples. The top plot shows the isotropic Mercator scale function: the scale on the parallel is the same as the scale on the meridian. The other plots show the meridian scale factor for the Equirectangular projection (h=1) and for the Lambert equal area projection. These last two projections have a parallel scale identical to that of the Mercator plot. For the Lambert note that the parallel scale (as Mercator A) increases with latitude and the meridian scale (C) decreases with latitude in such a way that hk=1, guaranteeing area conservation.

Scale variation on the Mercator projection

The Mercator point scale is unity on the equator because it is such that the auxiliary cylinder used in its construction is tangential to the Earth at the equator. For this reason the usual projection should be called a tangent projection. Since  tends to infinity as we approach the poles the Mercator map is grossly distorted at high latitudes and for this reason the projection is totally inappropriate for world maps (unless we are discussing navigation and rhumb lines). Narrower strips are better: a strip of width 16 degrees (centred on the equator) is accurate to within 1% or 1 part in 100.

Since   attains this value at  degrees (see figure below, red line). Therefore, the tangent Mercator projection is highly accurate within a strip of width 3.24 degrees centred on the equator. Within this strip Mercator is very good, highly accurate and shape preserving because it is conformal (angle preserving). These observations prompted the development of the transverse Mercator projections in which a meridian is treated 'like an equator' of the projection so that we obtain an accurate map within a narrow distance of that meridian. Such maps are good for countries aligned nearly north-south (like Great Britain) and a set of 60 such maps is used for the Universal Transverse Mercator (UTM). Note that in both these projections (which are based on various ellipsoids) the transformation equations for x and y and the expression for the scale factor are complicated functions of both latitude and longitude.

Secant, or modified, projections

Clearly the scale is now true at these latitudes whereas parallels beneath these latitudes are contracted by the projection and their (parallel) scale factor must be less than one. The result is that deviation of the scale from unity is reduced over a wider range of latitudes.

As an example, one possible secant Mercator projection is defined by 

The numeric multipliers do not alter the shape of the projection but it does mean that the scale factors are modified:
 secant Mercator scale,   
Thus 
 the scale on the equator is 0.9996,
 the scale is k = 1 at a latitude given by   where    so that  degrees,
Therefore, the projection has , that is an accuracy of 0.04%, over a wider strip of 4.58 degrees (compared with 3.24 degrees for the tangent form).
This is illustrated by the lower (green) curve in the figure of the previous section.

The maximum value of the scale factor is 1.001 for UTM and 1.0007 for OSGB.

The lines of unit scale at latitude  (north and south), where the cylindrical projection surface intersects the sphere, are the standard parallels of the secant projection.

Examples are 
Behrmann with standard parallels at 30N, 30S.
Gall equal area with standard parallels at 45N, 45S.

The scale plots for the latter are shown below compared with the Lambert equal area scale factors. In the latter the equator is a single standard parallel and the parallel scale increases from k=1 to compensate the decrease in the meridian scale. For the Gall the parallel scale is reduced at the equator (to k=0.707) whilst the meridian scale is increased (to k=1.414). This gives rise to the gross distortion of shape in the Gall-Peters projection. (On the globe Africa is about as long as it is broad). Note that the meridian and parallel scales are both unity on the standard parallels.

Mathematical addendum

For normal cylindrical projections the geometry of the infinitesimal elements gives

For the Mercator projection   giving : angles are preserved. (Hardly surprising since this is the relation used to derive Mercator).
Denote the point scale at P when the infinitesimal element PQ makes an angle 
 with the meridian by  It is given by the ratio of distances:

For example, the equirectangular projection has  so that 

There is no simple way of transferring a general finite separation to a bar scale and obtaining meaningful results.

Ratio symbol
While the colon is often used to express ratios, Unicode can express a symbol specific to ratios, being slightly raised: .

See also

 Geographic distance
 Scale (analytical tool)
 Scale (ratio)
 Scaling (geometry)
 Spatial scale

References

Cartography
Chinese inventions
Measurement